Barbara Matz (born 16 January 1998) is an Austrian sailor. She competed in the Nacra 17 event, partnering with Thomas Zajac, at the 2020 Summer Olympics.

References

External links
 
 

1998 births
Living people
Austrian female sailors (sport)
Olympic sailors of Austria
Sailors at the 2020 Summer Olympics – Nacra 17
Place of birth missing (living people)